Ships bearing the name HMS Salamander include:

This list may be incomplete.
 was a bomb ship built in 1687 at the Chatham Dockyard. Sold in 1713.
, renamed from Basilisk while on the stocks, was a bomb ketch of 265 tons (bm) launched on 4 September 1730 at the Woolwich Dockyard. Sold in 1744 to the British East India Company.
 was a fire ship purchased in 1745. Sold in 1748.
 was a fire ship purchased in 1757. Sold in 1761.
The Navy sold her in 1783. She then became a Greenland whaler, merchantman, convict transport to Australia, South Seas whaler, merchantman again, and slave ship. She was last listed in 1811, but did not appear in newspapers after 1804.
 was the mercantile Busy, launched at Yarmouth in 1777 that the Navy purchased in 1804 for use as a fireship but sold in 1807.
 was an 818-ton, 4-gun paddle sloop launched in 1832 and broken up in 1883.
 was a  built in 1889 at the Chatham Dockyard. Sold for breaking in 1906.
 was a  launched in 1936. She participated in the Second World War. She was scrapped in 1947.

Citations and references
Citations

References
 

Royal Navy ship names